LIFR also known as CD118 (Cluster of Differentiation 118),  is a subunit of a receptor for leukemia inhibitory factor.

Function 

The leukemia inhibitory factor (LIF) is a polyfunctional cytokine that affects the differentiation, survival, and proliferation of a wide variety of cells in the adult and the embryo. LIF action appears to be mediated through a high-affinity receptor complex composed of a low-affinity LIF binding chain (LIF receptor) and a high-affinity converter subunit, glycoprotein 130 (IL6ST, gp130). Both LIFR and gp130 are members of a family of cytokine receptors that includes components of the receptors for the majority of hematopoietic cytokines and for cytokines that affect other systems, including the ciliary neurotrophic factor, growth hormone and prolactin.

Interactions 

Leukemia inhibitory factor receptor has been shown to interact with glycoprotein 130.

LIFR has also been identified as a breast cancer metastasis suppressor that functions through the Hippo-YAP pathway. LIFR is down regulated in a number of breast carcinomas and may serve a prognostic tool.

See also 
 Cluster of differentiation

References

Further reading

External links 
 

Type I cytokine receptors
Clusters of differentiation